This is a list of Infantry weapons used by the Canadian Military throughout its history and military arms used by militaries in pre-Confederation conflicts in Canada.

Colonial Era to Confederation (1604 - 1867)

Black powder rifles, carbines and pistols

Service rifles and carbines

Confederation to First World War (1867 - 1914)

Service Pistols

Service Rifles

First World War to Second World War (1914 - 1939)

Service pistols

Rifles

Machine Guns

Armoured Fighting Vehicles

Second World War to Cold War (1939 - 1946)

Infantry Weapons

Utility Vehicles

Scout Vehicles

Armoured Carriers and Armoured Tractors

Tanks

Combat Tanks

Training Tanks

Self-Propelled Artillery and Anti-Aircraft

Engineering Vehicles

Artillery

Field artillery

Anti-tank guns

Anti-aircraft guns

Cold War to Modern (Cold War and peace keeping weapons until 2003)

Infantry Weapons

Utility Vehicles

Armoured Fighting Vehicles

Unsorted

Approved private purchase and secondary side-arms

Grenades, mines and other explosives

Infantry mortars

Bayonets and Knives

Swords 

1897 Pattern British Infantry Officer's Sword
1908 and 1912 Pattern British Army Cavalry Swords
1857 Artillery Officer Sword
1827 Navy Officer Sword
1926 Air Force Officer Sword

Uniforms, Load Bearing and Protective Equipment
Uniforms

Foreign Service Dress 1900-1903
Service Dress 1903-1939
Canadian Pattern and British Pattern
Khaki Drill
Battle Dress 1939-1967
Denison smock Used by the Airborne
Canadian Para Smock
Bush Dress
Combat Dress -1968-2002
CADPAT camouflage Combat Dress 2002–present

Load bearing equipment
Oliver Pattern Equipment 1898-19??
1903 Pattern Bandolier Equipment
1937 Pattern Web Equipment
1942 Battle Jerkin
1951 Pattern Web Equipment
1964 Pattern Web Equipment
1982 Pattern Web Equipment
Tactical Vest (or just known as Tac Vest). 2003–Present

Head dress
Canadian military fur wedge cap
Glengarry
Tam o'shanter
Field Service Cap
Beret
Balmoral bonnet
Brodie helmet
Mk II helmet
Mk III helmet
M1 Helmet
CG634

Protective equipment
Fragmentation Protection Vest

Ordnance

Ammunition

Present day
List of equipment of the Canadian Army

References

External links
 canadiansoldier.com

weapons
Weapons of Canada
Canada